Aneil Padman Nambiar (born 2 March 1984) is a former Indian cricketer.  Nambiar is a right-handed batsman who bowls right-arm medium pace.  He was born at Trivandrum, Kerala, and is more commonly known by his nickname Johnny Nambiar.

While in India, Nambiar represented Karnataka Under-16s in the 1999/00 season. Nambiar later moved to England, where he represented Oxfordshire in a single List A match against Herefordshire at Banbury Cricket Club Ground in the 1st round of the 2004 Cheltenham & Gloucester Trophy, which was played later in the 2003 season to avoid fixture congestion in 2004.  Opening the batting, he was dismissed for a duck by Franklyn Rose.  Oxfordshire lost the match by 126 runs.  This was his only appearance for the county, with Nambiar not featuring in any Minor counties cricket for Oxfordshire.

He would later briefly play Second XI cricket for Middlesex in 2004 and 2005..

References

External links
Aneil Nambiar at ESPNcricinfo
Aneil Nambiar at CricketArchive

1984 births
Living people
Cricketers from Thiruvananthapuram
Indian cricketers
Oxfordshire cricketers